"Traffic Lights" is a song by German recording artist Lena Meyer-Landrut. It was written by Hayley Aitken, Alexander James and Harry Sommerdahl and produced by production teams Beatgees and Biffco for her fourth studio album, Crystal Sky (2015). The song was released by Universal Music Germany as the album's lead single on 1 May 2015. The remix EP followed on 12 June 2015.

Track listing

Charts

Weekly charts

Year-end charts

Certifications

Release history

References

External links
 

2015 singles
Lena Meyer-Landrut songs
2015 songs
Songs written by Harry Sommerdahl
Songs written by Alex James (songwriter)
Universal Music Group singles
Songs written by Hayley Aitken